New Zealand  (abbreviated NZL) sent a team of 134 competitors and 57 officials  to the 1994 Commonwealth Games, which were held in Victoria, British Columbia, Canada. The flagbearer at the opening ceremony was Brian Fowler, and at the closing ceremony was Stephen Petterson.

New Zealand has competed in every games, starting with the first British Empire Games in 1930 at Hamilton, Ontario. Selection is the responsibility of the New Zealand Olympic Committee.

Medals

 
 
New Zealand was eighth in the medal table in 1994.

Gold

Cycling: 
 Mark Rendell — Men's Road Race

Lawn Bowls:    
 Katie Portas — Women's Singles Visually Impaired

Shooting:  
 Lindsay Arthur and Stephen Petterson — Men's 50m Rifle Prone (Pairs)
 Stephen Petterson — Men's 50m Rifle Prone

Swimming:  
 Danyon Loader — Men's 200m Butterfly

Silver

Athletics:
 Beatrice Faumuina — Women's Discus
 Kirsten Hellier — Women's Javelin
 Courtney Ireland — Men's Shot put

Cycling: 
 Brian Fowler — Men's Road Race  
 Glen McLeay — Men's 10 Mile Scratch Race
 Jacqui Nelson — Women's Points Race
 Sarah Ulmer — Women's 3000m Individual Pursuit

Shooting:  
 Gerd Barkman and Jocelyn Lees — Women's 10m Air Pistol (Pairs)
 Geoffrey Jukes and Brian Thomson — Open Skeet (Pairs)
 Julian Lawton and Greg Yelavich — Men's Free Pistol (Pairs)
 Geoffrey Smith — Fullbore Rifle Queen's Prize Open

Swimming:  
 Trent Bray — Men's 200m Freestyle
 Trent Bray, Danyon Loader, John Steel and Nick Tongue — Men's 4x100m Freestyle Relay
 Trent Bray, Guy Callaghan, Danyon Loader and John Steel — Men's 4x200m Freestyle Relay
 Danyon Loader — Men's 400m Freestyle
 Anna Simcic — Women's 200m Backstroke

Bronze

Athletics:
 Gavin Lovegrove — Men's Javelin Throw
 Ben Lucas — Men's Marathon Wheelchair
 Scott Nelson — Men's 30km Road Walk

Badminton: 
 Nick Hall — Men's Singles
 Rhona Robertson — Women's Singles

Lawn Bowls:    
 Peter Belliss, Rowan Brassey, Stewart Buttar and Bruce McNish — Men's Fours
 Marlene Castle, Colleen Ferrick, Adrienne Lambert and Ann Muir — Women's Fours
 Craig Nolan — Men's Singles Visually Impaired

Boxing: 
 Kalolo Fiaui — Men's 57-60kg (Lightweight)
 Trevor Shailer — Men's 60-64kg (Light-Welterweight)

Cycling: 
 Brendon Cameron, Julian Dean, Glen Thomson and Lee Vertongen — Men's 4000m Team Pursuit  
 Brian Fowler, Paul Leitch, Tim Pawson and Mark Rendell — Men's Team Time Trial
 Jacqui Nelson — Women's 3000m Individual Pursuit
 Donna Wynd — Women's Sprint

Gymnastics - Artistic: 
 Sarah Thompson — Women's Uneven Bars

Shooting:  
 Paul Carmine — Men's 10m Running Target
 Greg Yelavich — Men's 10m Air Pistol
 Greg Yelavich — Men's 25m Centre Fire Pistol

Swimming:  
 Danyon Loader — Men's 200m Freestyle
 Sean Tretheway — Men's 100m Freestyle

New Zealand Team

Athletics
Craig Barrett
Chantal Brunner
Nyla Carroll
Phil Clode
Angus Cooper
Tania Dixon
Shaun Farrell
Beatrice Faumuina
Gavin Foulsham
Kay Gooch
Anne Hare
Kirsten Hellier
Joanne Henry
Courtney Ireland
Robbie Johnston
Christine King
Gavin Lovegrove
Ben Lucas
Linn Murphy
Scott Nelson
Augustine Nketia
Kaye Nordstrom
Tracy Phillips
Doug Pirini
Simon Poelman
Richard Potts
Michelle Seymour
Jonathan Wyatt

See also
New Zealand Olympic Committee 
New Zealand at the Commonwealth Games
New Zealand at the 1992 Summer Olympics
New Zealand at the 1996 Summer Olympics

References

External links
NZOC website on the 1994 games 
Commonwealth Games Federation website

1994
Commonwealth Games
Nations at the 1994 Commonwealth Games